The David Davis III & IV House is a site on the National Register of Historic Places located in the county seat of McLean County, Illinois, Bloomington. The home was added to the register in 1982 due to its affiliation with the descendants of 19th century U.S. Supreme Court justice and Bloomington native David Davis, namely Illinois state senator David Davis IV. The house is not only listed on the National Register but it is also a contributing property to the local Davis-Jefferson Historic District.

References

National Register of Historic Places in McLean County, Illinois
Buildings and structures in Bloomington–Normal
Houses in McLean County, Illinois
Houses on the National Register of Historic Places in Illinois